David Best (born 6 September 1943) is an English former professional footballer. A goalkeeper, he made over 200 appearances for AFC Bournemouth, nearly 100 appearances for Oldham Athletic and 168 appearances for Ipswich Town between 1968 and 1974.

References

External links 
David Best at Pride of Anglia

Living people
1943 births
Association football goalkeepers
AFC Bournemouth players
Oldham Athletic A.F.C. players
Portsmouth F.C. players
Ipswich Town F.C. players
People from Wareham, Dorset
Footballers from Dorset
Dorchester Town F.C. managers
English football managers
English footballers